Zhongxiao Xinsheng (formerly transliterated as Chunghsiao Hsinsheng Station until 2003) is a metro station in Taipei, Taiwan served by the Taipei Metro.

Station overview

The station is a three-level, underground station with two island platforms and seven exits. It is located at the intersection of Zhongxiao East Road and Xinsheng South Road, hence the name of the station. Because space was reserved for the Xinzhuang line (B3) during construction of the Nangang line (B2), there is a direct transfer between the two lines using the pathway between B2 and B3.

Construction
The Xinzhuang Line station is 317.6 meters long, 16.5-32.65 meters wide, and 25.5 meters deep. The station is centered on a theme of "Modernization and High-tech", with glass and metallic materials utilized in the station design.

History
3 November 2010: Service of the Xinzhuang line segment to  begins.

Station layout

Exits
Exit 1: Zhongxiao Elementary School
Exit 2: Zhongxiao Park 
Exit 3: Zhongxiao E. Rd. Sec. 3
Exit 4: National Taipei University of Technology
Exit 5: Intersection of Xinsheng S. Rd. and Jinan Rd.
Exit 6: Taipei Methodist Church
Exit 7: Xinsheng S. Rd. Sec. 1, in front of the Securities and Futures Building

Around the station
 Guang Hua Digital Plaza
 Huashan 1914 Creative Park
 Kwoh-ting Li's Residence
 National Taipei University of Technology
 Qidong Street Japanese Houses (Taipei Qin Hall)
 Securities and Futures Bureau
 Suho Memorial Paper Museum
 Syntrend Creative Park
 Lianyun Park (between this station and Dongmen station)
 Zhongxiao Elementary School
 Securities and Futures Bureau
 Chunghwa Post Co., Ltd. 
 Taipei Academy of Banking and Finance

References

Railway stations opened in 1999
1999 establishments in Taiwan
Zhonghe–Xinlu line stations
Bannan line stations